Tazehabad-e Amin (also Romanized as Tāzehābād-e Amīn) is a village in Dasht-e Hor Rural District, in the Central District of Salas-e Babajani County, Kermanshah Province, Iran. At the 2006 census, its population was 205, in 43 families.

References 

Populated places in Salas-e Babajani County